Trametopsis is a fungal genus containing the single species Trametopsis cervina. Recent molecular phylogenetic analysis supports the placement of Leptoporus  in the Irpicaceae.

References

Irpicaceae
Monotypic Polyporales genera
Taxa described in 2008